Mecyclothorax curtus is a species of ground beetle in the subfamily Psydrinae. It was described by Sloane in 1895.

References

curtus
Beetles described in 1895